Prince Friedrich of Saxe-Meiningen, Duke of Saxony (Full given names: Friedrich Johann Bernhard Hermann Heinrich Moritz; 12 October 1861 – 23 August 1914) was a German soldier and member of the Ducal House of Saxe-Meiningen.

Birth and university 

Prince Friedrich was born in Meiningen the second son of Georg II, Duke of Saxe-Meiningen and his second wife Princess Feodora of Hohenlohe-Langenburg, a descendant of Diego Velázquez.

Prince Friedrich attended the University of Bonn where unusually for a royal prince he refused to accept an adjutant or maintain a horse and carriage. At university due to his royal status he was a member of the exclusive "Borussia" student dueling corps. Although the future William II, German Emperor was a prominent member, Prince Friedrich was not active in the group, rarely attending meetings, instead preferring to shun social life in favour of concentrating on his studies. He narrowly escaped serious injury at Bonn when a retort blew up near him during a chemical experiment.

Army and death
After finishing his studies Prince Friedrich entered into the army. Just as he had at university while a lieutenant in Strassbourg he was not an active member of society focusing on the study of artillery. He was promoted to colonel in 1902, brigadier general in 1907 and major general in 1910 before retiring from the army in 1913.

With the outbreak of the First World War in 1914, Prince Friedrich, despite suffering a broken arm a short while beforehand, returned to active service. He took the command of the 39th Reserve Infantry Brigade, part of the X Reserve Corps. The corps participated in the German invasion of Belgium. Unfortunately, Prince Friedrich was killed on 23 August. His son Prince Georg, travelled to meet his father's regiment to discover his father's fate. He discovered his father had been struck by shrapnel or machine gun bullets when he left a house he was using as an observation post. One of his sons, Ernst Leopold followed his father three days later.

His body was brought to the College of the Sacred Heart of Charleroi where he was embalmed. His body was returned to Meiningen for burial.

The American sculptor and Rome resident Moses Ezekiel created a bust of him.

Marriage and issue
Prince Friedrich married Countess Adelaide of Lippe-Biesterfeld (later Princess of Lippe), daughter of Count Ernst of Lippe-Biesterfeld, in Neudorf on 24 April 1889. The dynastic status of the marriage of Friedrich and Adelaide was questioned during the Lippe succession dispute when it was argued that if Adelaide's brother, Leopold, was excluded from the Lippe succession on the grounds that their great-grandmother, Modeste von Unruh, was not of equal birth, then the children of Friedrich and Adelaide should be excluded from the Saxe-Meiningen succession on the same grounds.

Prince Friedrich and Princess Adelaide had six children who were full members of the Ducal House of Saxe-Meiningen:

Princess Feodora of Saxe-Meiningen (29 May 1890–12 March 1972) she married Wilhelm Ernst, Grand Duke of Saxe-Weimar-Eisenach on 21 January 1910. They had four children
Princess Adelheid of Saxe-Meiningen (16 August 1891–25 April 1971) she married Prince Adalbert of Prussia on 3 August 1914. They had three children.
Georg, Prince of Saxe-Meiningen (11 October 1892 – 6 January 1946) he married  Countess Klara-Maria of Korff genannt Schmising-Kerssenbrock on 22 February 1919. They had four children. 
Prince Ernst of Saxe-Meiningen (23 September 1895-17 August 1914) at the age of eighteen he was killed in World War I. 
Princess Luise of Saxe-Meiningen (13 March 1899-14 February 1985) she married Götz Baron of Wangenheim on 25 October 1936. They had two children and three grandchildren:
Baroness Karin of Wangenheim (29 October 1937) she married Hans-Dieter Schwarze on 5 August 1963. They had one son:
Daniel Simeon Schwarze Schwarze (26 August 1965)
Baron Ernst Friedrich of Wangenheim (14 April 1941) he married Christa Margarete Binninger on 4 July 1963. They had two children:
Baroness Verena Regina of Wangenheim (20 November 1966)
Baron Peter of Wangenheim (1970-1970)
Bernhard, Prince of Saxe-Meiningen (30 June 1901–4 October 1984) he married Margot Grössler on 25 April 1931. They had two children, three grandchildren and one great-grandson. He remarried Baroness Vera Schäffer of Bernstein on  11 August 1948. They had three children.

Honours
He received the following orders and decorations:

Ancestry

References 
Almanach de Gotha, Gotha 1931

Bibliography 
 

1861 births
1914 deaths
House of Saxe-Meiningen
German military personnel killed in World War I
People from Meiningen
Princes of Saxe-Meiningen
Sons of monarchs